Bowen's Court was a historic country house or Anglo-Irish big house near Kildorrery in County Cork, Ireland.

House
The house was built in the 1770s by Henry Cole Bowen (died 1788). The Bowen family were minor Irish gentry, of Welsh origin- traced back to the late 1500s- resident in County Cork since Henry Bowen, a "notoriously irreligious" Colonel in the army of the regicide Cromwell, settled in Ireland. In 1786, it was referred to as Faraghy, the seat of Mr. Cole Bowen. It was held at one time by Mrs Eliza Bowen, when it was valued at £75. The house was attacked during the Irish Rebellion of 1798. Bowen's Court remained the Bowen family seat until 1959. The last owner was the novelist Elizabeth Bowen. She had a nervous breakdown in the 1950s and abandoned Bowen's Court leaving unpaid wages and bills, then sold it and stayed with friends and at hotels, before she rented a flat in Oxford. Bowen's Court was purchased, then demolished, by a developer in 1959.

Book
Elizabeth Bowen wrote a history of the house, entitled Bowen's Court, in 1942 and it is featured in her 1929 novel The Last September.

References

Houses completed in the 18th century
1770s establishments in Ireland
1961 disestablishments in Ireland
Buildings and structures demolished in 1961
Buildings and structures in County Cork
Country houses in Ireland
Houses in the Republic of Ireland

1942 non-fiction books
20th-century history books
Irish non-fiction books